Berdychiv is a historic city in the Zhytomyr Oblast (province) of northern Ukraine. Serving as the administrative center of the Berdychiv Raion (district), the city itself is of direct oblast subordinance, and does not belong to the district.

History

The territory on which the city is located was inhabited as early as the 2nd millennium BC. Bronze Age settlements and the remains of two settlements of the Chernyakhov culture were discovered here.

In 1430, Grand Duke of Lithuania Vytautas (великий князь литовський Вітовт) granted the rights over the area to Kalinik, the procurator (намісник) of Putyvl and Zvenigorod, and it is believed that his servant named Berdich founded a khutor (remote settlement) there. However the etymology of the name Berdychiv is not known.

In 1483, Crimean Tatars destroyed the settlement. During the 1546 partition between Lithuania and Poland, the region was listed as a property of Lithuanian magnate (Tyszkiewicz). According to the Union of Lublin (1569), Volhynia formed a province of the Polish–Lithuanian Commonwealth.

The fortified Carmelite monastery (built from 1627 to 1642 with funding from Janusz Tyszkiewicz Łohojski), captured and plundered by Bohdan Khmelnytsky in 1647, was dissolved in 1864.

In 1764, Kazimierz Pulaski defended the city with his 700 men surrounded by royal army during Bar Confederation.

The town underwent rapid development after king Stanisław August Poniatowski, under pressure from the powerful Radziwiłł family, granted it the unusual right to organize ten fairs a year. This made Berdychiv one of the most important trading and banking centers in the Polish–Lithuanian Commonwealth, and later, the Russian Empire. At the time, the saying "Pisz na Berdyczów!" ('Send letters to Berdychiv!') had an idiomatic meaning; because merchants from all over Poland, Lithuania, Ukraine and the rest of eastern and central Europe were sure to visit the town within two or three months of each other, it became a central poste restante (post office box) of the region. Later, because of the phrase being used in a popular poem by Juliusz Słowacki, "Pisz na Berdyczów!" acquired a second meaning as a brush-off; "send me a letter to nowhere" or "leave me alone".

In 1793, after the second division of the Polish-Lithuanian Commonwealth and the annexation of Right-Bank Ukraine to Russia, Berdychiv became part of the Volyn Province as a town of Zhitomirsky Uyezd. In 1798, it had 864 houses and 4820 people. The town was the administrative centre of the Berdichevsky Uyezd, a part of the Kyiv Governorate (1796–1925).

The banking industry was moved from Berdychiv to Odessa (a major port city) after 1850, and the town became impoverished again in a short period of time.

In 1846, the town had 1893 buildings, 69 of which were brick-made, 11 streets, 80 alleys, and four squares. Honoré de Balzac visited it in 1850 and noted that its unplanned development made it resemble the dance of a polka as some buildings leaned left while others leaned right. In 1857, Polish-British writer Joseph Conrad, regarded as one of the greatest novelists to write in the English language, was born in Berdychiv.

Jewish history

According to the census of 1789, Jews constituted 75% of Berdychiv's population (1,951 out of 2,640, of whom 246 were liquor dealers, 452 houseowners, 134 merchants, 188 artisans, 150 clerks and 56 idlers). In 1797, Prince Radziwill granted seven Jewish families the monopoly privilege of the cloth trade in the town. Jews were a major driving force of the town's commerce in the first half of the 19th century, founding a number of trading companies (some traded internationally) and banking establishments, and serving as agents of the neighboring estates of Polish nobility (szlachta).

By the end of the 18th century, Berdychiv became an important center of Hasidism. As the town grew, a number of noted scholars served as rabbis there, including Lieber the Great, Joseph the Harif and the Tzadik Levi Yitzchok of Berditchev (the author of Kedushat Levi), who lived and taught there until his death in 1809. See also Berditchev (Hasidic dynasty).

Berdychiv was also one of the centers of the conflict between Hasidim and Mitnagdim. As the ideas of Haskalah influenced parts of the Jewish communities, a large group of Maskilim formed in Berdychiv in the 1820s.

In 1847, 23,160 Jews resided in Berdychiv and by 1861 the number doubled to 46,683. Berdychiv became the city with the largest share of Jewish population in Ukraine and the Russian Empire. The May Laws of 1882 and other government persecutions affected Jewish population and in 1897, out of the town's population of 53,728, 41,617 (about 80%) were Jewish. 58% of Jewish males and 32% of Jewish females were literate. 

Around the turn of the 20th century, Berdychiv counted some 80 synagogues and batei midrash, and was famous for its cantors.

Until World War I, the natural growth was balanced by the emigration. After the bourgeois-democratic February revolution, during the Russian Civil War and Ukrainian War of Independence, in 1918–19, Berdychiv's mayor and chairman of its Jewish community was the Bundist leader David Petrovsky (Lipetz).

In the 1920s, the Yiddish language was officially recognized and, beginning in 1924, the city had a Ukrainian court of law that conducted its affairs in Yiddish. In 1923, Berdychiv became the center of the district and district of the same name, and in 1937 it entered the Zhytomyr region. 

The Soviet authorities closed most of the town's synagogues by the 1930s. All remaining Jewish cultural and educational institutions were suspended in the second half of the 1930s, before the beginning of World War II.

Nazi massacre
Most civilians from areas near the border did not have a chance to evacuate when the Nazis began their invasion on 22 June 1941. Berdychiv was occupied by the German Army from 7 July 1941 to 5 January 1944. An "extermination" German SS unit was established in Berdychiv in early July 1941 and a Jewish ghetto was set up. It was stated in one of the Einsatzgruppen reports that on "Sept. 1, and 2, 1941, leaflets and inflammatory pamphlets were distributed by Jews in Berdychiv. As the perpetrators could not be found, 1,303 Jews, among them 875 Jewesses over 12 years, were executed by a unit of the Higher SS and Police Leaders". The ghetto was liquidated on 5 October 1941, when all the inhabitants were murdered. Eyewitnesses stated that Ukrainian auxiliary police aided the 25-member shooting squad in corralling Jews into the ghetto, policing it, and killing those who attempted to escape. One witness to a mass killing of Jews in Berdychiv said, "They had to wear their festivity-dresses. Then their clothes and valuables were taken. The pits were dug and filled in by war prisoners who were executed shortly after."

The Nazis likely killed 20,000 to 30,000 Jews in Berdychiv, but a 1973 Ukrainian-language article about the history of Berdychiv says, "The Gestapo killed 38,536 people."

Berdychiv was the hometown of Soviet novelist Vasily Grossman, who worked as a war correspondent. Grossman's mother was murdered in the massacre. He wrote a detailed description of the events for publication in The Black Book, edited by Grossman and Ilya Ehrenburg, which dealt with the German treatment of Soviet Jews in the Holocaust. Originally meant for publication in the Soviet Union, it was banned there; one volume was eventually published in Bucharest in 1947. The original manuscript is in the archive of Yad Vashem, Jerusalem.

A detailed account of the massacre as told by the narrator's mother appears in a fictionalized context in Grossman's novel Life and Fate, which is widely available in an English translation by Robert Chandler.

Russia invasion of Ukraine 
On March 16, 2022, Berdychiv was damaged by Russian air strikes. A few buildings were torn down.

Demographics

Notable residents
Alphabetically by surname. Pseudonyms treated as one word.
 Jacob Pavlovitch Adler (birthplace of his mother, Hessye Halperin)
 Honoré de Balzac (married in Berdychiv)
 Joseph Conrad (1857–1924), Polish and British writer
 John Demjanjuk (born Ivan Mykolaiovych Demjanjuk; 1920–2012), Ukrainian-American accused of war crimes and crimes against humanity carried out while serving as a guard at Nazi extermination camps during World War II
 Der Nister, pen name of Pinchus Kahanovich (1884–1950), Yiddish author, philosopher, translator, and critic
 Charles Joachim Ephrussi, the patriarch of the Ephrussi family grain dynasty
 Lipa Feingold (1878–1945), American jeweler and composer
 Abraham Firkovich, Karaite hakham
 Abraham Goldfaden (1840–1908), considered the father of the Jewish modern theatre
 Israel Grodner (1887), one of the founding performers in Yiddish theater
 Vasily Grossman (1905–1964), Soviet Russian writer and journalist
 Felix Lembersky, fine arts, painter (1913–1970), born and raised in Berdychiv, worked as theater stage designer
 Raquel Liberman (1900–35), Jewish-Polish victim of human trafficking who broke up the notorious Zwi Migdal forced-prostitution ring in Argentina.
 Osip Mikhailovich Lerner (Y. Y. Lerner), writer, critic, and folklorist
 Mendele Mocher Sforim, pen name of Sholem Yankev Abramovich, Jewish author and one of the founders of modern Yiddish and Hebrew literature
 Pedotser, whose real name was A.M. Kholodenko (1828-1902), a Klezmer violin virtuoso
 Antoni Protazy Potocki, szlachta (owned and organized several factories in the village of Makhnivka, near Berdychiv)
 Anatoliy Puzach (1941–2006), Soviet football player and Ukrainian coach
 David Petrovsky (1886–1937) — the mayor of the city and the chairman of the Jewish community of Berdychiv in 1918–1919, a member of the Central Committee of the General Jewish Labour Bund in Lithuania, Poland and Russia, a member of the Central Committee of the Jewish Socialist Federation and the Socialist Party of America, the editor of the Jewish Daily Forward newspaper in New York, journalist, political and economic scientist, the statesman of the Soviet Union.
 Sholem Aleichem, pen name of Solomon Naumovich Rabinovich (1859–1916), leading Yiddish author and playwright, lived here doing research for his novels in the 1880s
 Boris Sidis (1867–1923), Ukrainian American psychologist, physician, psychiatrist, and philosopher of education
 Valeriy Skvortsov (1945–) Soviet high jumper; European champion
 Stempenyu, stage name of Iosef Druker (1822–79), a klezmer violin virtuoso and bandleader
 Dmytro Tymchuk (1972–2019) Ukrainian Army Reserve colonel, "informatsiinyi sprotyv" group coordinator
 Levi Yitzchok of Berditchev (Levi Yosef Yitzhak of Berdichev; 1740–1809), Torah commentator, chassidic rabbi, leader, religious songwriter, and leader of the Berditchev Hasidic dynasty.

Some sources erroneously claim that the pianist Vladimir Horowitz was born in Berdychiv. Horowitz's birth certificate unequivocally gives Kyiv as his birthplace.

Gallery

Berdychiv on stage 
See: Abraham Ellstein

See also
 History of the Jews in Russia and the Soviet Union
 Berdichev machine-building plant

References

Further reading
 From Berdichev to Jerusalem by Miriam Sperber, 1980
 The Bones of Berdichev: The Life and Fate of Vasily Grossman by John Garrand, 1996

External links
 "My Berdychiv" – history, present, people (in Ukrainian language)
 Jewish History of Berdichev, Part 1 and Part 2 at Jewishgen.org
 Berdichev at Simon Wiesenthal Center
 Berdychiv lands from the earliest times to the beginning of the 20th century (1999, in Ukrainian language: Бердичівська земля з найдавнішших часів до початку ХХ ст.)
 PBS Independent Lens: "Berdichev" 
 The murder of the Jews of Berdychiv during World War II, at Yad Vashem website
 

 
Cities in Zhytomyr Oblast
Cities of regional significance in Ukraine
Berdychiv Raion
Berdichevsky Uyezd
Kiev Voivodeship
Populated places established in the 1430s
Jewish Ukrainian history
Shtetls
Holocaust locations in Ukraine
Mass murder in 1941